Ludi petak (Crazy Friday) is the third studio album by Serbian rock band Miligram. It was released 23 December 2013 through City Records.

Music videos
The music video for "Vrati mi se nesrećo" premiered on 29 December 2013. "Apsolutna ljubav" and the title song both have music videos which premiered in April 2014.

Tour
Miligram kicked off a concert tour promote their album on 12 April 2014 in Tuzla, Bosnia and Herzegovina.

Track listing

Personnel

Instruments

Alen Ademović – music (5)
Aleksandar Milić – music, backing vocals
Ivana Selakov – backing vocals
Vladimir Milenković – accordion
Petar Trumbetaš – bouzouki
Nenad Bojković – electric guitar
Ivan Milosavljević – guitar
Jovica Smrzlić – keyboards
Strahinja Banović – trumpet

Production and recording

Aleksandar Milić – arrangement, producing (2, 3, 10)
Ivan Milosavljević – arrangement (10)
James Cruz – mastering
Ivan Milosavljević – programming, co-producing, sound design, mixing

References

External links
 Ludi petak on Discogs

2013 albums
City Records albums
Miligram (band) albums